Play Nice may refer to:

Film and TV
Play Nice, a 1992 horror film directed by Terri Treas
Play Nice, a 2014 comedy film directed by Rodman Flender

Music
Play Nice, a 2015 album from ApologetiX
"Don't Play Nice" debut single by English recording artist Verbalicious, now known as Natalia Kills Natalia Keery-Fisher discography
Play Nice Recordings The Nextmen
Play Nice EP in 2013 Donora (band)
Play Nice Amanda Havard  2012